The ancient Egyptian Bull (hieroglyph), Gardiner sign listed no. E1, is the representation of the common bull. The bull motif is dominant in protodynastic times (see Bull Palette), and also has prominence in the early dynastic Egypt, famously on the Narmer Palette.
Its phonetic value is kꜣ (Egyptological pronunciation "ka").
 bull hieroglyph is sometimes reinforced with a complementary hieroglyph, the "arm with stick of authority" (D40), E1:D40  (see photo, Deir el-Bahari).

See also

Ka (Egyptian soul)

References

Budge, (1920), 1978.  An Egyptian Hieroglyphic Dictionary, E.A.Wallace Budge, (Dover Publications), c 1978, (c 1920), Dover edition, 1978. (In two volumes, 1314 pp. and cliv-(154) pp.) (softcover)
Budge E.A.Wallace Budge, Dover edition, 1991; Original: c 1911 as: A Hieroglyphic Vocabulary to the Theban Recension of the Book of the Dead with an Index to All the English Equivalents of the Egyptian Words, (Kegan Paul, etc. Ltd, London, publisher). Dover: (softcover)

Egyptian hieroglyphs: mammals